Sankara Narayana Menon Chundayil popularly known as Unni Gurukkal is a Kalaripayattu gurukkal or teacher from Chavakkad. For his contributions in the field of Kalaripayattu, he has won several noted awards including Kerala Folklore Academy Award and India's fourth highest civilian honor Padma Shri.

Biography
Sankara Narayana Menon was born in 1929 on 15 February, to Mudavangattil Sankunni Panicker and Chundayil Kalyanikutti Amma. His family were traditional leaders of the army of the king of Vettathunadu in Malabar. At the age of six, Menon started learning Kalaripayattu from his father Sankunni Panicker. He made his debut at Mudavangad Kalari at the age of fourteen. He became a Kalari gurukkal (teacher) at the age of 16.

Unni Gurukkal spread Kalaripayattu, an Indian martial art from Kerala, outside India and started branches of his Kalaripayattu school in countries such as the United States, United Kingdom, United Arab Emirates, France and Belgium. His team, which has performed Kalaripayattu in over 50 countries, also performed Kalaripayattu during Indian Prime Minister Narendra Modi's visit to Dubai.

Personal life
His wife Soudamini Amma is from Malappuram, from the Ozhur Kozhissery Punnakal family. Menon married Saudamini, at the age of 33. Their sons Krishnadas Gurkal, Rajan Gurukkal and Dineshan Gurukkal are also Kalaripayattu practitioners.

Awards and honors
 Padma Shri 2022
 Kerala Folklore Akademi Gurupooja Award 2019
 Kerala Kalamandalam Silver Jubilee Award
 Nehru Yuvakendra Award
 Suvarnamudra Award
 Indian Kalaripayattu Association Lifetime Achievement Award
 Then Kerala Governor P. Sathasivam honored Unni Gurukkal on National Sports Day

References

1929 births
Living people
Kalarippayattu practitioners
Indian male martial artists
Recipients of the Padma Shri in sports